The TurnTable End of the Year Top 50 of 2020 is a chart that ranks the best-performing singles in Nigeria. Its data, published by TurnTable magazine, is based collectively on each single's weekly physical and digital sales, as well as airplay and streaming. At the end of a year, TurnTable publishes an annual list of the 50 most successful songs throughout that year on its top 50 charts based on the information. The 2020 edition was published on 30 December 2020, calculated with data from 1 January to 14 December 2020.

History

On 9 November 2021, TurnTable Co-Editor-in-Chief Ayomide Oriowo released the highlight of TurnTables Top 50 in 2020. Davido made a number of achievements on the chart from 16 November to 14 December. He became the first artist to occupy the first four spots on the chart. He also became the first artist to replace themselves at number 1, with "Fem", "Holy Ground", "The Best", and "Jowo".

DJ Neptune's "No Body", became 2020's top song, top radio song, top airplay song (radio and television), top song by a duo/collaboration, and top Afro-pop song. Davido became 2020's top artist, top television artist, top streaming artist, top YouTube artist, top Audiomack artist, top male artist, top Afro-pop artist, and his song "Fem" became the top song by a male artist. Burna Boy became 2020's top radio artist, top Shazam artist, and top songwriter of 2020. Simi's "Duduke" became top television song, top YouTube song, top song by female artist, top R&B song, and she became the top female artist of 2020. Omah Lay's "Bad Influence" became top streaming song, top Boomplay song, top Audiomack song, top Apple Music song, top digital song, and top Shazam song. Mayorkun became top Triller artist, and his song "Geng" became top Triller song. Fireboy DML became top Boomplay artist, and top R&B artist. Ladipoe's "Know You" became top hip-hop/rap song of 2020.

Cheque's "Zoom" became the top melodic rap/trap song of 2020. Olamide became top hip-hop/rap artist of 2020. Tems became top alternative artist, and her song "Damages" became top alternative song of 2020. Mercy Chinwo became the top gospel artist, and her song "Obinasom" became the top gospel song of 2020. Master KG "Jerusalema (remix)" became top international song, and top African radio song of 2020. The Weeknd's "Blinding Lights" became top international radio song. Drake became top international artist, and his song "Toosie Slide" became the top international television song of 2020. BTS became the top international group/duo of 2020. Nasty C's "There They Go" became top African television song of 2020. Ed Sheeran's "Thinking Out Loud" and Styl-Plus's "Olufunmi" became the top catalog radio songs of the last five years. Grammy Afrobeat producer Telz became top producer of 2020.

Year-end list

References

Nigerian record charts
2020 in Nigerian music
2020 record charts
TurnTable charts